Love, Laughter and Truth is a compilation album consisting of previously unreleased material by American stand-up comedian and satirist Bill Hicks, released by Rykodisc in 2002. The material on the album was originally recorded by Hicks himself for personal use but was reviewed after his death by the Hicks Estate, after which it was decided to release the previously unreleased bits on this album. The material comes from recordings made from 1990-93 in Denver, San Ramon, West Palm Beach, San Francisco and Pittsburgh.

Sound quality
The album is plagued by poor sound quality. This is due to the poor equipment that was used for many of the recordings and the lack of volume adjustments while recording. Before releasing the album, careful remastering was done. For instance, more than 120 pops were removed and seven sections de-hissed. Still, poor sound and volume variations between tracks can easily be heard.

Title
The title of the album comes from the last words of Hicks before he died. He had written in a letter, "I left in love, in laughter, and in truth, and wherever truth, love and laughter abide, I am there in spirit."

Track listing
"Intro/Smokers vs. Drinkers" – 1:33
"Drunk Driving" – 6:53
"New York Apartment" – 1:53
"My One Man Show" – 1:32
"Pot Smoking" – 1:11
"Drugs Are Bad" – 3:14
"Children on Airplanes" – 3:52
"50 Year Smoker" – 1:37
"Smoking in Heaven" – 3:57
"Australia" – 2:18
"Satiating the American Comedy Audience" – 0:44
"Dance Club" – 1:44
"Speaking of Homosexuality" – 2:32
"Poe-Naw-Grah-Fee" – 1:46
"A Question for the Ladies" – 4:33
"My Favorite New Kid" – 1:07
"You Can't Get Bitter" – 2:53
"Closing Bit" – 0:27

References

Jeff Rougvie, Love, Laughter and Truth (Rykodisc), album cover inlay.
Rykodisc catalog entry.

External links
Guardian Unlimited - Leave them laughing.

Bill Hicks albums
2002 compilation albums
Compilation albums published posthumously
2000s comedy albums
Comedy compilation albums
Live comedy albums
Spoken word albums by American artists
Live spoken word albums
Rykodisc compilation albums
Rykodisc live albums
2002 live albums
Stand-up comedy albums